Max Brown is an Australian film, television and theatre actor from Melbourne, Victoria. Max is best known for his portrayal of Oscar Wolfe in the TV series The Gloaming on Stan. His mainstream theatrical debut was in Benjamin Law's play Torch the Place for Melbourne Theatre Company in 2020.

Biography
Brown was born in Sydney the eldest of three children. He made his onscreen acting debut on Neighbours as Robin Dawal in 2015.

Filmography

Film

Television

Theatre

Awards and nominations

References

External links 
  
Max Brown actor biography at BGM

Australian male film actors
Australian male television actors
Living people
21st-century Australian male actors
Year of birth missing (living people)